Anik Khan is a Bangladeshi-American hip hop artist.

Early life
Khan was born in Dhaka, Bangladesh and raised in Astoria, Queens, New York. His father was involved in politics and fought in the Bangladesh Liberation War. In 1993, when Khan was four, his father moved their family to the United States.

Khan moved to Leesburg, Virginia with his family in his early in high school and began spending his time making beats on FL Studio. Khan described going through an identity crisis during this time, saying "I kinda didn't know who I was, I was like away from my culture". Khan later attended Full Sail University in Florida, studying recording arts engineering. While attending university, Khan would travel back to New York to record music. Khan's father and sister moved back to New York while his mother still lived in Virginia at their house, and Khan would divide his time after university living in the two states. Khan's mother would later move back to New York and live with them in LeFrak City, as they could no longer afford to live in Astoria.

In Queens, Khan would attend day parties where he met many West Indian people, which would go onto influence his music.

Career

2015–2016: Early career and I Don't Know Yet 
With Fadia Kader, Def Jam's director of brand partnerships and strategic marketing, as his manager, Khan created a musical project and was on the verge of a record deal. Yet he never released anything under the name Anik Khan until the I Don't Know Yet EP, which was released in July 2015  I Don't Know Yet included the singles "Shadows" and "The Knowing". The EP was titled I Don't Know Yet to reflect Khan's feeling of not knowing the direction of his career and music at the time, with different of the songs on the record being years old at the time of its release.

"Too Late Now", produced by Jarreau Vandal, was released in February 2016, while the single "Renegade" released in June 2016. After the release of these singles, Khan's career started to slowly take off with his music being played by Ebro Darden on Beats 1 radio and doing college tours around the country.

2017–present: Kites and rising success 
After the release of the singles "Too Late Now" and "Renegade" and his career beginning to take off, Khan started to put together an album, which would eventually be released as Kites in April 2017. Khan described the album as "less about the immigrant story" and more about himself, "a young guy who's chasing a dream in his late 20s". Khan also described the album as his first proper body of work. The album was supported by the singles "Cleopatra", "Habibi" and "Columbus". "Cleopatra", a love ballad, combines sounds from around the world through using West Indian drums and sampling the Bollywood song "Jiya Jale" from A. R. Rahman's Dil Se.. soundtrack, while also interpolating lyrics from Craig David's song "Fill Me In". "Habibi" is a celebration of immigrant culture, specifically Yemeni culture, reflecting those who run the local bodegas in Queens. The song "Columbus", named after the famed explorer Christopher Columbus, is the outro to the album, and was released as a single in response to President Donald Trump's travel ban. A revolutionary hymn, "Columbus" was described by Khan as about any oppressor and "what they think they did and what really happened". The song ends with Bengali poetry, ending the album with a reflection of his Bengali roots.

Style and influences
Khan's favourite rapper is fellow Queens native Nas. Outside of hip hop influences, Khan's music draws influence from different cultures, such as South Asian (specifically Bangladeshi and Indian) and West Indian.

Personal life
Khan is a Muslim. He is a fan of English football club  Arsenal.

Discography

Studio albums 

 Kites (2017)

Extended plays 

 I Don't Know Yet (2015)

Singles

References

External links
 Official website

Rappers from New York City
Living people
Bengali musicians
21st-century Bangladeshi musicians
Bangladeshi male musicians
Bangladeshi songwriters
Bangladeshi composers
Bangladeshi lyricists
1989 births
21st-century American rappers
21st-century American male musicians

ar:أنيك خان
bn:আনিক খান
hi:अनिक खान
pa:ਅਨਿਕ ਖਾਨ
pnb:انک خان
ur:انک خان